Roger Tait is a New Zealand former rugby league footballer who represented New Zealand in the 1968 World Cup.

Playing career
Tait grew up in Huntly and played for Huntly United. In 1961 he represented Waikato.

Tait then transferred to Auckland, playing for the Glenora Bears in the Auckland Rugby League competition. By 1963 Tait captained Auckland against South Africa, with Auckland winning 10–4.

During the 1964 season Tait scored 203 points for Glenora. He was first selected for the New Zealand national rugby league team in 1965 and went on to play in eleven tests for New Zealand, including three matches at the 1968 World Cup.

Tait later played for the Papakura Sea Eagles.

References

Living people
Auckland rugby league team players
Glenora Bears players
Huntly United players
New Zealand national rugby league team players
New Zealand rugby league players
Papakura Sea Eagles players
Rugby league fullbacks
Rugby league players from Huntly, New Zealand
Waikato rugby league team players
Year of birth missing (living people)